Jalan Pekeliling 3, Federal Route 342, is a federal road in the Kuala Lumpur International Airport (KLIA), Malaysia.

The Kilometre Zero is located at KLIAORR junctions.

At most sections, the Federal Route 343 was built under the JKR R5 road standard, with a speed limit of 90 km/h.

List of junctions

References

Malaysian Federal Roads
Expressways and highways in the Klang Valley
Sepang District
Roads in Selangor